The 2016 Iowa Barnstormers season was the team's sixteenth season as a professional indoor football franchise and second in the Indoor Football League (IFL). One of ten teams that compete in the IFL for the 2016 season, the Barnstormers are members of the United Conference.

Led by head coach Joe Brannen, the Barnstormers play their home games at the Wells Fargo Arena in the Des Moines, Iowa.

Schedule
Key:

Pre-season

Regular season
All start times are local time

Standings

Roster

References

External links
Iowa Barnstormers official website

Iowa Barnstormers seasons
Iowa Barnstormers
Iowa Barnstormers